John Wesley Owens (born January 10, 1980) is a former American football tight end. He was drafted by the Detroit Lions in the fifth round of the 2002 NFL Draft. He played college football at Notre Dame.

Owens has also been a member of the Chicago Bears, Miami Dolphins, Cleveland Browns, New Orleans Saints, Seattle Seahawks, and Oakland Raiders .

References

External links
Detroit Lions bio

1980 births
Living people
Players of American football from Washington, D.C.
American football tight ends
DeMatha Catholic High School alumni
Notre Dame Fighting Irish football players
Detroit Lions players
Chicago Bears players
Miami Dolphins players
Cleveland Browns players
New Orleans Saints players
Seattle Seahawks players
Oakland Raiders players